The Live Oak School District contains 6 schools in Live Oak, Santa Cruz County, California. The district was founded in 1872 by Martin Kinsley, an Irish immigrant. The first school in the district was the Live Oak School House. The superintendent, Lorie Chamberland, was appointed in 2018. The student population is about 2,100, with 52% Hispanic/Latino and 32% White. The 15-16 budgeted expenditures are just over $17 million.

Schools
 Del Mar Elementary School
Preschool-5th Grade. 1955 Merrill St. Marilyn Rockey, Principal
 Green Acres Elementary School
Preschool-5th Grade. 966 Bostwick Lane. Rebecca Taylor, Principal
 Live Oak Elementary School
Preschool-5th Grade. 1916 Capitola Rd. Greg Stein, Principal
 Ocean Alternative Education Center
Kindergarten-8th Grade. 984-6 Bostwick Lane. Mary Sauter, Principal 
 Shoreline Middle School
Grades 6-8. 855 17th Ave. Colleen Martin, Principal, Michael Dorney, Assistant Principal
 Tierra Pacifica Charter School
Kindergarten-8th Grade. 986 Bostwick Lane. Jennifer Proudfoot, Principal

Programs
 Preschool
 Child Development
 After School Education and Safety (ASES)
 Middle School "Teen Center"

Mission
As a diverse community in the heart of Santa Cruz County, Live Oak School District’s mission is to prepare preschool through 12th grade students to make meaningful contributions in a rapidly changing world through engagement in academically rigorous curriculum within a collaborative, innovative learning environment. The District's created four specific goals based on a community visioning process:  1) Family Engagement; 2) Culture of Learning; 3) Wellness; and 4) Academic Achievement.

History
The District was founded in 1872.

Awards
Green Acres Elementary School won the California Distinguished School Award for 2006. Shoreline Middle School has been recognized by Standards and Poor's for boosting its test scores and closing the gap between socially and economically disadvantaged groups and the rest of the student body.

See also
List of school districts in Santa Cruz County, CA
Live Oak, Santa Cruz, California

References

External links
 

School districts in Santa Cruz County, California
School districts established in 1872
1872 establishments in California